Jaume Santi Amat Duran (born 1 March 1970 in Barcelona, Catalonia) is a former field hockey player from Spain. He won the silver medal with the men's national team at the 1996 Summer Olympics in Atlanta, Georgia. He is the son of Jaume Amat i Fontanals, who was Olympics same discipline at 1964 and 1972 Olympic Games.

References
Spanish Olympic Committee

External links
 

1970 births
Spanish male field hockey players
Olympic field hockey players of Spain
Field hockey players at the 1992 Summer Olympics
Field hockey players at the 1996 Summer Olympics
Field hockey players at the 2000 Summer Olympics
1998 Men's Hockey World Cup players
Living people
Olympic silver medalists for Spain
Field hockey players from Barcelona
Medalists at the 1996 Summer Olympics
Club Egara players
20th-century Spanish people